Lillian Gay Berry (1872-1962) was an American classicist. She taught for over four decades at Indiana University, where she was the first woman to be promoted to full professor.

References

1872 births
1962 deaths
American classical scholars
Indiana University faculty
Women classical scholars